Alles Door Oefening Den Haag, commonly known by the abbreviated name ADO Den Haag, is a Dutch association football club from the city of The Hague. They play in the Eerste Divisie, the second tier of Dutch football, following relegation from the Eredivisie in the 2020–21 season. The club was for a time known as FC Den Haag, with ADO representing the amateur branch of the club. Despite being from one of the traditional three large Dutch cities, it has not been able to match Ajax, Feyenoord or PSV in terms of success in the Eredivisie or in European competition. There is nonetheless a big rivalry with Ajax and Feyenoord. The Dutch words "Alles Door Oefening" translate into Everything Through Practice.

History

1905–1971: ADO
On 1 February 1905, the club Alles Door Oefening (ADO) was founded in café 'Het Hof van Berlijn' (now: De Paap) in The Hague. In the first years of its existence, the club endured some difficult times as many members refused to pay their fees and the sport of cricket was more popular in the city. ADO started out in the local Haagsche Voetbal Bond, but promoted to the national Nederlandsche Voetbal Bond in 1912. That year they promoted to the third level (3e klasse NVB) and two years later they even earned the championship on that level.

After moving to the Zuiderpark stadium in 1925, ADO continued to grow to a club of some significance. In 1926, the club earned promotion to the highest national level, the Eerste Klasse. In the following years the red-green-white team struggled not to be relegated at first, but rose to the top of the league at the end of the 1930s. In 1939 the club just missed the class title after losing to DWS in Amsterdam. In 1940, the title seemed very close again, but another second-place finish was the highest achievable position after the club saw many players being drafted in the army with World War II closing in. This time another club from Amsterdam, Blauw-Wit, grabbed the title. In 1941, ADO finally won their class and moved on to the national champion's competition, losing that to Heracles.

In the 1941–42 season, all the stars were aligned, and although the war made everyday life harder and harder, the club seemed undefeatable. After winning their league, often by many goals difference, ADO moved on to the national champion's competition and fought for the title with Heerenveen, AGOVV, Eindhoven and Blauw-Wit. A 5–2 victory over AGOVV finally brought ADO their first national title. In 1943 ADO won another title, amongst others by beating legend Abe Lenstra's Heerenveen 8–2.

The Hague had to wait until the 1960s for more successes from their local club. After Ernst Happel joined ADO as a coach in 1962, the club worked their way to the top of the league again. They finished third in the final ranking in 1965. In 1963, 1964 and 1966, ADO played in the national cup final, the KNVB Cup, but lost. In 1968, they again reached the final, and this time beat Ajax to win it. In the 1970–71 season, ADO started the league with 17 games undefeated and were at the top of the national league, but ended their season as No. 3.

In 1967, ADO played a summer in North America's United Soccer Association, under the name San Francisco Golden Gate Gales. The club finished tied for second in the Western Division.

1971–1996: FC Den Haag

In 1971 the club merged with city rivals Holland Sport to form FC Den Haag.

The club again reached the Dutch Cup final in 1972 (this time losing 3–2 to Ajax) then went on to win the trophy for a second time in 1975, this team defeating Twente 1–0. Their greatest European success was a quarter-final game against West Ham United for the European Cup Winners Cup in 1976. A 4–2 win in The Hague followed by a 3–1 defeat in London meant elimination. In the 1980s, FC Den Haag was often associated with hooliganism and financial backfall. However, they reached their fourth Dutch Cup final in 1987, losing 4–2 (again to Ajax) following two extra-time winners from Marco van Basten.

On 3 April 1982, hooligans of the club burned down part of their own home ground, Zuiderpark Stadion. The fire was set after a 4–0 loss to HFC Haarlem. It damaged the ground's oldest stand dating back to 1928 and caused $500,000 in damages. The damaged part was rebuilt and opened in 1986.

After another merger the club was renamed ADO Den Haag in 1996.

1996–present: ADO Den Haag
After a long spell in the country's second tier of league football, ADO Den Haag played four seasons in the Eredivisie then were relegated again in the 2006–07 season. However, after finishing sixth in the 2007–08 season, they went on to win the play-offs, meaning promotion back to the Eredivisie for 2008–09. The club's new home was finished in 2007: the 15,000-capacity Kyocera Stadion, formerly known as the Den Haag Stadion. Their home colors are yellow and green. They began the 2008–09 season with two wins which put them on top of the Eredivisie for the first time in 32 years. In the 2009–10 season, the club's average home attendance was 11,745 spectators.

The team enjoyed success in the 2010–11 season. Defeating rivals Ajax twice was one of the highlights of the season. ADO Den Haag finished seventh in the league and won the play-offs (beating Roda JC and Groningen) which offered the last Dutch UEFA Europa League place. They won the first matches against Lithuanian side Tauras (3–2, 2–0) but lost the first away leg for the third qualifying round against Cypriot club Omonia 3–0 in Nicosia.

ADO supporters have strong links with Welsh club Swansea City. Flags of the respective clubs are often flown at the matches of the other club, and both clubs regularly hold pre-season friendly matches. Legia Warsaw (Poland), Club Brugge (Belgium) and Juventus (Italy) also share strong supporter links with ADO Den Haag.

The club was in serious financial trouble in 2008 and in June 2014, its majority shareholder agreed to sell the club to Chinese-based United Vansen International Sports Company, Ltd. for a reported $8.9 million. The current ownership group has "promised to invest millions of euros" into the club. UVS was founded in 2008 and was responsible for organising the Beijing Olympic closing ceremony and football curtain-raisers attracting prominent football clubs such as Juventus, Milan, Internazionale, Napoli, Lazio, Tottenham Hotspur, West Ham United and Hull City.

The 2019–20 season was declared void, with no promotion/relegation, which meant ADO Den Haag remained in Eredivisie for the 2020–21 season despite their 17th-place finish. On 13 May 2021, ADO Den Haag was relegated to the Eerste Divisie as the club can no longer finish higher than 17th in the 2020–21 Eredivisie season.

Sponsors

Honours
Eredivisie (up to 1955–56 the Netherlands Football League Championship)
 Champions: 1941–42, 1942–43

Eerste Divisie
 Champions: 1956–57, 1985–86, 2002–03

KNVB Cup
 Champions: 1967–68, 1974–75
 Runners-up: 1958–59, 1962–63, 1963–64, 1965–66, 1971–72, 1986–87

European record
UEFA Europa League

UEFA Cup Winners' Cup

Domestic results

Below is a table with ADO Den Haag's domestic results since the introduction of the Eredivisie in 1956.

Current squad

Other players under contract

Out on loan

Coaching staff 

|Club Physician
| Daan van de Pol, MD PhD
|-

Managers

 John Donaghy (1928–32)
 Wim Tap (1936–46)
 Franz Fuchs (1952–53)
 Dick Groves (1953)
 Franz Gutkas (1954–55)
 Rinus Loof (1955–62)
 Ernst Happel (1 July 1962 – 30 June 1969)
 Václav Ježek (1 July 1969 – 30 June 1972)
 Vujadin Boškov (1 July 1974 – 30 June 1976)
 Anton Malatinský (1 July 1976 – 30 June 1978)
 Piet de Visser (1 July 1978 – 30 June 1980)
 Hans Kraay (1 July 1980 – 30 June 1981)
 Cor van der Hart (1 July 1981 – 30 June 1983)
 Rob Baan (1 July 1983 – 30 June 1986)
 Pim van de Meent (1 July 1986 – 30 June 1988)
 Co Adriaanse (1 July 1988 – 12 February 1992)
 Nol de Ruiter (1 July 1992 – 30 June 1993)
 Lex Schoenmaker (1994–95)
 Theo Verlangen (1995–96)
 Mark Wotte (1 July 1996 – 31 December 1997)
 André Hoekstra (31 December 1997 – 30 June 1999)
 Rob Meppelink (1 July 1999 – 30 June 2000)
 Stanley Brard (1 July 2000 – 5 April 2001)
 Piet de Zoete (caretaker) (5 April 2001 – 30 June 2001)
 Rinus Israel (1 July 2001 – 30 November 2003)
 Lex Schoenmaker (caretaker) (1 December 2003 – 30 June 2004)
 Frans Adelaar (1 July 2004 – 20 November 2006)
 Lex Schoenmaker (caretaker) (21 November 2006 – 30 June 2007)
 Wiljan Vloet (1 July 2007 – 30 June 2008)
 André Wetzel (1 July 2008 – 17 April 2009)
 Raymond Atteveld (17 April 2009 – 30 March 2010)
 Maurice Steijn (caretaker) (30 March 2010 – 30 June 2010)
 John van den Brom (1 July 2010 – 29 June 2011)
 Maurice Steijn (30 June 2011 – 5 February 2014)
 Henk Fräser (5 February 2014 – 30 June 2016)
 Željko Petrović (1 July 2016 – 7 February 2017)
 Alfons Groenendijk (8 February 2017 – 2 December 2019) 
 Alan Pardew (24 December 2019 – 28 April 2020)
 Aleksandar Ranković (15 May 2020 – 9 November 2020)
 Ruud Brood (10 November 2020 – 28 February 2022)
 Giovanni Franken (caretaker) (28 February 2022 – 1 June 2022)
 Dirk Kuyt (2 June 2022 – 24 November 2022)
 Dick Advocaat (28 November 2022 – Present)

References

External links

 
 

 
United Soccer Association imported teams
Association football clubs established in 1905
1905 establishments in the Netherlands
Football clubs in the Netherlands
Football clubs in The Hague